Vesperus sanzi is a species of beetle in the Vesperidae family that can be found in Portugal and western Spain.

References

Vesperidae
Beetles described in 1895
Beetles of Europe